Albina Youth Opportunity School is an alternative high school in Portland, Oregon, United States.

The school has been accredited by the Northwest Association of Accredited Schools since 1993.

References

High schools in Multnomah County, Oregon
Alternative schools in Oregon
Educational institutions established in 1966
Public high schools in Oregon
Public middle schools in Oregon
1966 establishments in Oregon
North Portland, Oregon